Vanina Noemí Correa (born 14 August 1983) is an Argentine footballer who plays as a goalkeeper for Rosario Central and the Argentina women's national team.

Club career
Correa has played for Renato Cesarini, Boca Juniors, Social Lux, Rosario Central and San Lorenzo in her country.

International career
She played the inaugural match of the 2007 FIFA Women's World Cup against Germany, which Argentina lost 11–0, the biggest defeat in the history of the tournament until Thailand lost 13–0 to the United States in 2019. The following year she was the starting goalkeeper in the 2008 Summer Olympics women's football tournament.

When Argentina failed to qualify for the 2011 FIFA Women's World Cup, Correa retired from football the following year. She was persuaded into a national team comeback in 2017, when coach Carlos Borrello encountered her at a domestic fixture. She played in all seven of Argentina's matches at the 2018 Copa América Femenina and in both legs of the subsequent CONCACAF–CONMEBOL play-off win over Panama.

At the 2019 FIFA Women's World Cup Correa won acclaim for her performance in Argentina's 1–0 defeat by England in Le Havre. She made six saves including a penalty kick from Nikita Parris. English coach Phil Neville was effusive in his praise: "Their goalkeeper was incredible. I saw her before the game and she was unbelievable, even in the warm-up. What you've seen tonight is an unbelievable goalkeeping performance." The BBC Sport report described Correa's display as "a form of redemption", after her unhappy experiences at the 2003 and 2007 editions of the tournament.

Personal life
On 24 February 2014, Correa gave birth to twins, who are the result of fertility treatments she did, in the company of her partner at that time.

International Tournaments

References

External links

Vanina Correa at BDFútbol

1983 births
Living people
Argentine women's footballers
People from Rosario Department
Women's association football goalkeepers
Rosario Central (women) players
Club Atlético Banfield (women) players
Boca Juniors (women) footballers
Argentina women's international footballers
2003 FIFA Women's World Cup players
2007 FIFA Women's World Cup players
2019 FIFA Women's World Cup players
Olympic footballers of Argentina
Footballers at the 2008 Summer Olympics
Pan American Games silver medalists for Argentina
Pan American Games medalists in football
Footballers at the 2019 Pan American Games
Footballers at the 2003 Pan American Games
Footballers at the 2007 Pan American Games
Argentine expatriate sportspeople in Spain
Medalists at the 2019 Pan American Games
Sportspeople from Santa Fe Province
Expatriate women's footballers in Spain
Argentine expatriate women's footballers
RCD Espanyol Femenino players